Tank Battles: The Songs of Hanns Eisler is a solo album by German singer Dagmar Krause released by Island Records in 1988. It is a collection of 26 songs by German composer Hanns Eisler sung by Krause in English. She also sang the songs in the original German which were released by Island at the same time on a companion album, Panzerschlacht: Die Lieder von Hanns Eisler.

Tank Battles was reissued by Voiceprint Records in 1994 with all its original tracks, plus ten bonus tracks taken from the German edition, Panzerschlacht.

Reception

In a review of Tank Battles at AllMusic, John Dougan called it "[a] worthy follow up" to Krause's previous album, Supply and Demand. He said her vocals here are "stunning" and the instrumental backing is "impeccable".

Writing in The Wire, Philip Clark called Tank Battles a "laudable attempt" by Krause to present a modern interpretation of songs by Eisler-Brecht. He said producer Greg Cohen's "sensitive arrangements" of the album's material "winningly evokes 1920s Berlin". Clark stated that Krause's "vocal production, the shaping of her melodic contours and the brittle, staccato phrasing" all owes itself to Eisler's work.

Legacy
The album was included in the book 1001 Albums You Must Hear Before You Die.

Track listing
All songs composed by Hanns Eisler; texts by Bertolt Brecht except where stated.

Tank Battles
"The Song of the Whitewash" – 2:07
Translation: N. Gould-Verschoyle
"(I Read About) Tank Battles" – 1:30  
Translation: John Willett
"You Have to Pay" – 1:43  
Text: Walter Mehring
Translation: Jim Woodland, Malcolm Green
"Chanson Allemande" – 1:20  
Text: Berthold Viertel
Translation: Andrew Dodge
"The Ballad of the Sackslingers" – 3:24  
Text: Julian Arendt
Translation: Dagmar Krause, Jim Woodland
"Mother Beimlein" – 1:16  
Translation: Lesley Lendrum
"The Perhaps Song" – 1:50  
Translation: Bettina Jonic, Katherine Helm
"Lied von der Belebeden Wirkung des Geldes (The Song of the Invigorating Impact of Cash)" – 4:32  
"Mankind" – 0:59  
Text: Hanns Eisler
Translation: Dagmar Krause, Jim Woodland
"Bettelied" – 1:27  
"Song of a German Mother" – 2:31  
Translation: Eric Bentley
"Change the World – It Needs It" – 2:07  
Translation: Eric Bentley
"Bankenlied (Banking Song)" – 2:59  
Text: Siegmar Mehring
"Legende von der Entstehung des Buches Taoteking (Legend of the Origin of the Book of the Taote King)" – 6:43  
"Balad of (Bourgoise) Welfare" – 2:53  
Text: Kurt Tucholsky
Translation: Jim Woodland
"Mother's Hands" – 2:02  
Text: Kurt Tucholsky
Translation: Malcolm Green
"Berlin 1919" – 2:30  
Text: Anonymous
Translation: Eric Bentley
"And I Shall Never See Again" – 1:52  
Translation: Eric Bentley
"Genevieve: Ostern ist Ein Ball sur Seine (Genevieve: Easter There is a Ball on the Seine)" – 1:05
"The Wise Woman and the Soldier" – 3:43  
Translation: Eric Bentley
"Failure in Loving" – 1:04  
Text: Heinrich Heine
Translation: Eric Bentley
"Und Endlich Stirbt" – 1:12  
Text: Peter Altenberg
"The Rat Men – Nightmare" – 1:18  
"The Homecoming" – 1:34  
Translation: Eric Bentley
"The Trenches" – 3:44  
Text: Kurt Tucholsky
"To a Little Radio" – 1:05

Panzerschlacht
"Lied von der Tünche" – 2:09
"Panzerschlacht" – 1:31
"Zahlen müsst Ihr" – 1:44
Text: Walter Mehring
"Chanson Allemande" – 1:17
Text: Berthold Viertel
"Ballade von den Säckeschmeißern" – 3:23
Text: Julian Arendt
"Mutter Beimlein" – 1:21
"Das Vielleicht-Lied" – 1:50
"Lied von der belebenden Wirkung des Geldes" – 4:32
"Der Mensch" – 0:57
Text: Hanns Eisler
"Bettellied" – 1:28
"Lied Einer Deutschen Mutter" – 2:33
"Ändere die Welt – Sie braucht Es" – 2:06
"Bankenlied" – 2:58
Text: Siegmar Mehring
"Legende von der Entstehung des Buches Taoteking" – 6:43
"(Ballade von der) Wohltätigkeit" – 2:53
Text: Kurt Tucholsky
"Mutterns Hände" – 2:05
Text: Kurt Tucholsky
"Spartacus 1919" – 2:31
Text: Anonymous
"Und ich Werde Nicht Mehr Sehen" – 1:51
"Geneviève: Ostern ist Ball sur Seine" – 1:04
"Ballade vom Weib und dem Soldaten" – 3:41
"Verfehlte Liebe" – 1:04
Text: Heinrich Heine
"Und Endlich Stirbt" – 1:11
Text: Peter Altenberg
"The Rat Men – Nightmare" – 1:19
"Die Heimkehr" – 1:35
"Der Graben" – 3:43
Text: Kurt Tucholsky
"An den Kleinen Radioapperat" – 1:05

Tank Battles (reissue)
"The Song of the Whitewash" – 2:07
Translation: N. Gould-Verschoyle
"(I Read About) Tank Battles" – 1:30  
Translation: John Willett
"You Have to Pay" – 1:43  
Text: Walter Mehring
Translation: Jim Woodland, Malcolm Green
"Chanson Allemande" – 1:20  
Text: Berthold Viertel
Translation: Andrew Dodge
"The Ballad of the Sackslingers" – 3:24  
Text: Julian Arendt
Translation: Dagmar Krause, Jim Woodland
"Mother Beimlein" – 1:16  
Translation: Lesley Lendrum
"The Perhaps Song" – 1:50  
Translation: Bettina Jonic, Katherine Helm
"Lied von der belebenden Wirkung des Geldes (The Song of the Invigorating Impact of Cash)" – 4:32  
"Mankind" – 0:59  
Text: Hanns Eisler
Translation: Dagmar Krause, Jim Woodland
"Bettellied" – 1:27  
"Song of a German Mother" – 2:31  
Translation: Eric Bentley
"Change the World – It Needs It" – 2:07  
Translation: Eric Bentley
"Bankenlied (Banking Song)" – 2:59  
Text: Siegmar Mehring
"Legende von der Entstehung des Buches Taoteking (Legend of the Origin of the Book of the Taote King)" – 6:43  
"Balad of (Bourgoise) Welfare" – 2:53  
Text: Kurt Tucholsky
Translation: Jim Woodland
"Mother's Hands" – 2:02  
Text: Kurt Tucholsky
Translation: Malcolm Green
"Berlin 1919" – 2:30  
Text: Anonymous
Translation: Eric Bentley
"And I Shall Never See Again" – 1:52  
Translation: Eric Bentley
"Genevieve: Ostern ist ein Ball sur Seine (Genevieve: Easter There is a Ball on the Seine)" – 1:05
"The Wise Woman and the Soldier" – 3:43  
Translation: Eric Bentley
"Failure in Loving" – 1:04  
Text: Heinrich Heine
Translation: Eric Bentley
"Und endlich stirbt" – 1:12  
Text: Peter Altenberg
"The Rat Men – Nightmare" – 1:18  
"The Homecoming" – 1:34  
Translation: Eric Bentley
"The Trenches" – 3:44  
Text: Kurt Tucholsky
"To a Little Radio" – 1:05  
"Panzerschlacht" – 1:33 *
"Vielleicht Lied" – 1:51 *
"Der Mensch" – 0:55 *
Text: Hanns Eisler
"Lied von der Deutschen Mutter" – 2:32 *
"Mutterns Hande" – 2:03 *
Text: Kurt Tucholsky
"Spartacus 1919" – 2:31 *
Text: Anonymous
"Ich werde nicht mehr sehen" – 1:53 *
"Die Heimkehr" – 1:35 *
"Der Graben" – 3:43 *
Text: Kurt Tucholsky
"Den kleinen Radioapparat" – 1:06 *
* Bonus tracks taken from Panzerschlacht

Personnel
Dagmar Krause – vocals
Alexander Bălănescu – viola
Steve Berry – double bass
Michael Blair – percussion
Lindsay Cooper – bassoon
Andrew Dodge – keyboards
Phil Edwards – saxophone
John Harle – saxophone
Sarah Homer – clarinet
John Leonard – bassoon
Ian Mitchell – clarinet
Bruce Nockles – trumpet
Ashley Slater – tuba
Steve Sterling – horns
Graeme Taylor – guitar, banjo
Gertrude Thoma – vocals
Danny Thompson – double bass
John Tilbury – keyboards

References

External links
Album online on Radio3Net a radio channel of Romanian Radio Broadcasting Company 
.
.
.

1988 albums
Island Records albums